X3: Albion Prelude is a space trading and combat simulator by German developer Egosoft and is the fifth game in their X series. An add-on to 2008's X3: Terran Conflict, X3: Albion Prelude features new content, functionality and improvements, including additional ships, stations, and sectors; a new plot line; war scenario sectors, and several stock exchanges. X3: Albion Prelude was released on Steam on 15 December 2011.

Gameplay

Synopsis

Plot

Development

Reception 

Albion Prelude was generally well received, with a score of 75 out of 100 on Metacritic.

See also
List of PC games

References

External links

2011 video games
Deep Silver games
Linux games
MacOS games
Space opera video games
Space trading and combat simulators
Video game expansion packs
Video games developed in Germany
Windows games
X (video game series)
Video games set in the 30th century

de:X (Spieleserie)#X³: Albion Prelude
it:X³: Terran Conflict#X³: Albion Prelude